This list tries to include all artists/bands from all genres originating from Japan. This list does not include artists/bands who perform in Japanese but are of different origin.

0-9 and symbols 

°C-ute
12012
175R
44 Magnum
88Kasyo Junrei
9mm Parabellum Bullet
9Goats Black Out

A

AAA
Abingdon Boys School
A.B.'s
Aburadako
Access
Acid
Acid Android
Acid Black Cherry
Acid Mothers Temple
Acidman
ACO
Ado
Afilia Saga
Ai Otsuka
Aice5
aiko
Aimer
Aimyon
Aion
Aira Mitsuki
Ajico
Akanishi Jin
AKB48
Akeboshi
Aki Misato
Akiko Suwanai
Akiko Yano
Akino Arai
Akira Ifukube
Akira Kushida
Akishibu Project
Aldious
Alexandros
Alice Nine
Aliene Ma'riage
Ali Project
Alma Kaminiito
Ami Onuki
Ami Suzuki
Amoyamo
AMWE
An Cafe
Angela
Angela Aki
Angelo
Animetal
Annabel
Anna S
Anri
Anthem
Anti Feminism
Aphasia
Aqua Timez
Arashi
Asa-Chang & Junray
Asian Kung-Fu Generation
Astro
Atsushi Sakurai
Aural Vampire
Ayabie
Aya Hirano
Aya Kamiki
Aya Ueto
Ayaka
Ayaka Hirahara
Ayana
Ayumi Hamasaki
Ayumi Miyazaki

B

Baad
BaBe
Babylon
Babymetal
Back Number
Back-On
Baiser
Bakusute Sotokanda Icchome
Balflare
Balzac
Band-Maid
Base Ball Bear
Bathtub Shitter
Baroque
BBQ Chickens
Beat Crusaders
The Beatniks
BeForU
Bellzlleb
Bennie K
Berryz Koubou
Bi Kyo Ran
The Birthday
Bis (Japanese rock band)
The Black Mages
Blam Honey
Blankey Jet City
Bleach
Blood
Bloodthirsty Butchers
Blood Stain Child
The Blue Hearts
Blues Creation
Bomb Factory
Bon-Bon Blanco
Bonnie Pink
The Boom
Boom Boom Satellites
Boøwy
Boredoms
Boris
Bow Wow
Boys and Men
Brahman
Bright
The Brilliant Green
Buck-Tick
Buffalo Daughter
Bump of Chicken
Buono!
By-Sexual
B'z

C

C-ute
Candies
C.C.C.C.
Cali Gari
Camino
Camellia
The Candy Spooky Theater
Capsule
The Captains
Casiopea
Chaba
Char
Chara
Champloose
Changin' My Life
Charcoal Filter
Charlotte
Chatmonchy
Cherryblossom
The Chewinggum Weekend
Chieko Kawabe
Chihara Minori
Chihiro Onitsuka
Chirinuruwowaka
Chisato Moritaka
Chitose Hajime
Chocolat
Chottokyuu
Church of Misery
Cibo Matto
Clammbon
Clear’s
Cö Shu Nie
Coaltar of the Deepers
Cocco
Cocobat
Coldrain
Color
Cool Joke
Complex
Concerto Moon
Core of Soul
Cornelius
Corrupted
Crack Fierce
Crossfaith
The Cro-Magnons
Crystal Lake
Curio
CY8ER
Cymbals
Cyntia
Czecho No Republic

D

D
D-51
D=Out
D'erlanger
D'espairsRay
Day After Tomorrow
Dead End
Deen
The Dead Pop Stars
Deadman
Deathgaze
Def Tech
Defspiral
Deluhi
Demon Kakka
Denki Groove
Depapepe
Der Zibet
Destrose
Devil Kitty
Diaura
Die in Cries
Diesel Guitar
Dio – Distraught Overlord
Dir En Grey
Disclose
DJ Kentaro
DJ Krush
DJ Sharpnel
Do As Infinity
Doa
Does
Dolly
Doom
Doopees
Double
Double Dealer
Dragon Ash
Dragon Head
Dream
Dreams Come True
Dué le Quartz
DuelJewel
Duran

E

Earthshaker
Eastern Youth
Edge of Spirit
Ego-Wrappin'
Eiichi Ohtaki
Eir Aoi
Eikichi Yazawa
Elephant Kashimashi
Ellegarden
El Dorado
Envy
Especia
Eternal Elysium
Eve of Destiny
Every Little Thing
Exile
Exist Trace
eX-Girl
Ezo

F

Fact
Fade
Fake?
Fantastic Plastic Machine
FictionJunction
Field of View
Filament
Fire Bomber
Fishmans
Flap Girls' School
Flame
Flipper's Guitar
Flow
Flower Travellin' Band
Flumpool
For Tracy Hyde
Freenote
French Kiss
Friction
Fujifabric
Fujii Kaze
Fujiwara Hiroshi
Fukuyama Masaharu
Funkist
Funky Monkey Babys
Fushitsusha
Fuzzy Control

G

Gacharic Spin
Gackt
GaGaGa SP
Galileo Galilei
Gallhammer
Galneryus
Gari
Garlic Boys
Garnet Crow
Garo
Gastunk
Gauze
Gazette
Gedō
Geinoh Yamashirogumi
Gen Hoshino
Genkaku Allergy
Ghost (1984 band)
Ghost (2004 band)
Girugamesh
Girl Next Door
GISM
Glay
Globe
GO!GO!7188
Gō Hiromi
Going Under Ground
Golden Bomber
Gollbetty
Good Morning America
Gore Beyond Necropsy
Government Alpha
GPKism
Granrodeo
Greeeen
Greenmachine
Grief of War
Ground Zero
Guitar Vader
Guitar Wolf
Guniw Tools

H

Halcali
Hanako Oku
Hanatarash
Hangry & Angry
Happy End
Haruka to Miyuki
Haru Nemuri
Head Phones President
Heartsdales
Hearts Grow
Heath
Heidi.
Hello Sleepwalkers
Hey! Say! JUMP
Hi-Standard
Hibari Misora
Hidari
Hide
Hidehiko Hoshino
Hideki Saijo
High and Mighty Color
Hijokaidan
Hikaru Kotobuki
Hikaru Utada
Hikashu
Himiko Kikuchi
Himitsu Kessha Kodomo A
Hinatazaka46
Hinoi Team
Hiroko Moriguchi
Hironobu Kageyama
Hiroshi Kitadani
Hisashi Imai
Hitomi Shimatani
Hitomi Takahashi
Hitomi Yaida
Hitoto Yo
Hizaki
HKT48
Hōkago Princess
Home Made Kazoku
Husking Bee
HY
Hyde

I

I Don't Like Mondays.
Iceman
Ichirou Mizuki
Ichiko Aoba
Idoling!!!
Idol College
Idol Renaissance
Ikimono-gakari
Incapacitants
Inoue Joe
Inoran
Inugami Circus-dan
IOSYS
Ippu-Do
Isao Sasaki
Isao Tomita
Hideki Ishima
Izabel Varosa

J

J
JAM Project
Jacks
Jagatara
Janne Da Arc
Jasmine You
Jazztronik
Jealkb
Jero
Jimsaku
Jinn
Jiros
JO1
Johnny's West
Juice=Juice
Judy and Mary
Juju
Jun
JUNNA
Justin Heathcliff
Jyongri
Jyukai

K

K.A.Z
Kagerou
Kagrra
Kahimi Karie
Kalafina
Kamaitachi
Kamen Joshi
Kami
Kamijo
Kana Nishino
Kana Ueda
Kanjani Eight
Kannivalism
Kanon Wakeshima
Kaori Mochida
KAT-TUN
Kazumasa Hashimoto
Keiichi Suzuki (Moonriders)
Keiji Haino
Keiko Masuda
Kelun
Kemuri
Ken
Ken Hirai
Ken Ishii
Ken Lloyd
Kenji Ohtsuki
Kenji Ozawa
Kenshi Yonezu
Ketsumeishi
Keyakizaka46
Keytalk
Kikuo
Shoukichi Kina
King Brothers
KinKi Kids
Osamu Kitajima
Kinniku Shōjo Tai
Kis-My-Ft2
KK Null
Klaha
Kobukuro
Kōenji Hyakkei
Kohei Mihara
Koichi Yamadera
Kōji Kondō
Kokia
Kome Kome Club
Korekyojinn
Koshi Inaba
Kotani Kinya
Kotoko
Kousokuya
Közi
Kra
Kumi Koda
Kuroyume
Kusumi Koharu
Kwon Rise
Kyary Pamyu Pamyu
Kyosuke Himuro
Kyu Sakamoto

L

L'Arc-en-Ciel
La'cryma Christi
Lama
Lareine
Laputa
Last Alliance
Lazy
Lead
Leo Ieiri
LiSA
Lia
Lindberg
Ling tosite Sigure
Lite
Little by Little
LM.C
Logic System
Long Shot Party
Love Psychedelico
Lovebites
Loudness
Luke Takamura
Luna Sea
Luna Haruna
Lynch

M

MAA
Maaya Sakamoto
Macdonald Duck Eclair
Kō Machida
Maher Shalal Hash Baz
Mai
Mai Kuraki
Make-Up
Maki Asakawa
Maki Nomiya
Makiko Hirabayashi
Malice Mizer
Mami Kawada
Mamoru Miyano
Mana
Mao Abe
Marbell
Mari Hamada
Mary's Blood
Masaaki Endoh
Masami Okui
Masayuki Suzuki
Mass of the Fermenting Dregs
Masonna
Matenrou Opera
Yumi Matsutoya
Maximum the Hormone
Meg
Megamasso
Mejibray
Melt-Banana
Melody
Merengue
Merry
Merzbow
Metalucifer
Metronome
M-Flo
Michiro Endo
Midori Takada
Mie
Mihimaru GT
Mika Arisaka
Mika Nakashima
Mikuni Shimokawa
Miliyah Kato
Minako Honda
Minmi
Misia
Missile Innovation
Mitski
Miwa
Mix Speakers, Inc
Miyavi
Moi dix Mois
Momoiro Clover Z
Monde Bruits
Monkey Majik
Mono
Monoral
Morning Musume
Motohiro Hata
Motoi Sakuraba
Move
Mr. Children
Mucc
Mute Beat
Myco

N

Nagisa ni te
Nagi Yanagi
Masaya Nakahara 
Meiko Nakahara
Nami Tamaki
Namie Amuro
Nanase Aikawa
Nana Kitade
Nana Mizuki
Naoki Satō
Nemophila
NEWS
Nightmare
Nil
Ningen Isu
Nine Miles
NMB48
No Regret Life
Nobodyknows
Nobukazu Takemura
Nobuo Uematsu
Nobuo Yamada
Nobuteru Maeda
Nogizaka46
Nogod
Nokko
Nookicky
Noriko Tadano
Nothing's Carved in Stone
Number Girl
Nico Touches the Walls
Nujabes
NYC
N Zero

O

Oblivion Dust
Oceanlane
Off Course
Okuda Tamio
Oldcodex
Onmyo-Za
On/Off
Orange Range
Oreskaband
One Ok Rock
OOIOO
Otomo Yoshihide
Outrage

P

P-Model
Panic Channel
Paris Match
Party Rockets GT
Pasocom Music Club
Pata
Pay Money to My Pain
Peelander-Z
Penicillin
Perfume
Phantasmagoria
Pierrot
Piko
Pink Lady
Pizzicato Five
Plastic Tree
Plastics
Plenty
Plus-Tech Squeeze Box
Polysics
Porno Graffitti
Potshot
Prague
predia
Princess Princess
Prism
Psy-S
Psycho le Cému
Puffy AmiYumi
Pyg

Q

Qp-Crazy
Queen Bee
Question?
Quruli

R

Radwimps
Rain
Rami
Rankin' Taxi
Raphael
Ray
RC Succession
Rebecca
Rei Harakami
Remioromen
Rentrer en Soi
Rice
Rie fu
Rikiji
Rimi Natsukawa
Rina Aiuchi
Ringo Sheena
Rip Slyme
Ritual Carnage
Riyu Kosaka
Rize
Rolly Teranishi
Round Table
Rovo
Ruins
Run&Gun
Rurutia
Ryuichi Kawamura
Ryuichi Sakamoto

S

Sabbat
Saber Tiger
Sadie
Sadistic Mika Band
Sads
Sakanaction
Sakura
Sakura Gakuin
Sambomaster
Sandii & the Sunsetz
Saori@destiny
Sarina Suno
Satsuki
Sayuri
Scanch
Scandal
Scha Dara Parr
Schaft
School Food Punishment
Schwarz Stein
Schwein
Screw
The Something
Seagull Screaming Kiss Her Kiss Her
See-Saw
Seiichi Yamamoto
Seiji Ozawa
Seikima-II
Serial TV Drama
Sex Machineguns
Sexy Zone
Shakkazombie
Shanadoo
Sharam Q
Sheena & The Rokkets
Shigeru Izumiya
Shiina Ringo
Shilfee and Tulipcorobockles
Shinichi Ishihara
Shinichi Osawa
Shinya Yamada
Shonen Knife
Show-Ya
Showtaro Morikubo
Shugo Tokumaru
Siam Shade
Sid
Sigh
Silent Poets
Silk Road
Skeletons
SKE48
Skin
SMAP
Snowkel
Softball
Soft Ballet
Soil & "Pimp" Sessions
Solmania
Sons of All Pussys
Sophia
Soul Flower Union
Soulhead
Sound Horizon
Southern All Stars
Sowelu
SpecialThanks
Spitz
Splay
Spyair
Stance Punks
Stereopony
Stomu Yamashta
Sug
Sugizo
Suga Shikao
Suneohair
Sunmyu
Sunny Day Service
SunSet Swish
Supercar
Super Beaver
Super Bell"Z
Super Junky Monkey
Surf Coasters
Susumu Hirasawa
The System of Alive
Syu

T

T-Square
Taiji Sawada
Takagi Masakatsu
Takako Minekawa
Takayuki Miyauchi
Tak Matsumoto
Takeshi Terauchi
Taki Rentaro
Tamurapan
Tanpopo
Tackey & Tsubasa
Taeko Onuki
Taia
Taj Mahal Travellers
Tatsuya Ishii
Team Syachihoko
Tegomass
Tenniscoats
Teppei Koike
Teriyaki Boyz
Terra
Terra Rosa
Teru
Tetra-Fang
Tetsu Takano
Tetsuya
Tetsuya Komuro
The 5.6.7.8's
The Back Horn
The Candy Spooky Theater
the GazettE
The Gerogerigegege
The Golden Cups
The Hiatus
The High-Lows
The Kiddie
The Mad Capsule Markets
The Mass Missile
The Mops
The Oral Cigarettes
The Pees
The Piass
The Pillows
The Predators
The Rodeo Carburettor
The Roosters
The Scanty
The Spiders
The Stalin
The Tempters
The Yellow Monkey
Theatre Brook
Thee Michelle Gun Elephant
Thug Murder
Thyme
The Tigers
TM Network
TM Revolution
Toe
Jun Togawa
Tohoshinki
TOKIO
Toko Yasuda
Tokyo Jihen
Tokyo Ska Paradise Orchestra
Tokyo Yankees
Toll Yagami
Tommy February6
Tommy Heavenly6
Tatsuro Yamashita
Tomohisa Yamashita
Tomoyasu Hotei
Toshi
Tourbillon
Towa Tei (of Deee-Lite)
Tricot
TrySail
Tsunku
Tujiko Noriko
TUBE
Tuyu
Two-Mix
Tyrant

U

Ua
Yuya Uchida
Ulfuls
Ultra Living
Umineco Sounds 
Under Graph
United
United Future Organization
Unsraw
Urbangarde
Uverworld

V

V6
Vajra
Valshe
Vamps
Varuna
Vaundy
Versailles
Vidoll
Violet UK
Vistlip
Vivid
Vivisick
Vodka Collins

W

W
Wada Kouji
Wands
WaT
White Ash
Whiteberry
Wink
Wino
World's End Girlfriend
Wyse
W-inds

X

X Japan

Y

Yahyel
Yamaguchi Kappei
Joe Yamanaka
Yann Tomita
Yellow Generation
Yellow Magic Orchestra
Yoasobi
Yoichiro Yoshikawa
Yoko Kanno
Yoko Ono
Yoko Takahashi
Yorushika
Yōsei Teikoku
Yoshida Brothers
Kazuya Yoshii
Yoshiki Fukuyama
Yoshiki Hayashi
Yoshino Nanjo
Yoshinori Sunahara
Yoshioka Yui
Yuria
Yui
Yui Aragaki
Yui Horie
Yui Makino
Yukari Fresh
Yuki Isoya
Yukihiro
Yumemiru Adolescence
Yumi Yoshimura
Yuna Ito
Yura Yura Teikoku
Yuri Kasahara
Yūta Furukawa
Yutaka Higuchi
Yuya Matsushita
Yūzō Kayama
Yuzu

Z

Zard
Zazel
Zazen Boys
Zeebra
Zelda
Zeni Geva
Zeppet Store
Zi:Kill
Zigzo
Zone
Zoobombs
Zoro
Zutomayo
Zwei
ZZ

See also
J-pop
Japanese hardcore
Japanese hip hop
Japanese metal
Japanoise
List of J-pop artists
List of Japanese hip hop musicians
Music of Japan
Shibuya-kei
Visual kei

References